Donnellyanthus is a monotypic genus of flowering plants in the family Rubiaceae. The genus contains only one species, viz. Donnellyanthus deamii, which is found in Oaxaca, El Salvador, Guatemala, Honduras, and Nicaragua.

References

External links
Donnellyanthus in the World Checklist of Rubiaceae

Monotypic Rubiaceae genera